The 1938 World Table Tennis Championships men's doubles was the 12th edition of the men's doubles championship.
Jimmy McClure and Sol Schiff won the title after defeating Viktor Barna and Laszlo Bellak in the final by three sets to two. It was McClure's third consecutive title.

Results

See also
List of World Table Tennis Championships medalists

References

-